Kusehvand (also Romanized as Kūsehvand; also known as Kūsevand) is a village in Baladarband Rural District, in the Central District of Kermanshah County, Kermanshah Province, Iran. At the 2006 census, its population was 180, in 39 families.

References 

Populated places in Kermanshah County